Bluesette is a jazz standard, composed by Toots Thielemans.  First recorded by Toots Thielemans in 1961, with lyrics added by Norman Gimbel, the song became an international hit. It has since been covered by over one hundred artists.

Selected cover versions
 Vikki Carrfor her album Discovery! Miss Vikki Carr (1964).
 Sarah Vaughana single release in 1964.
 Johnny Mathis (1965) (The Complete Global Albums Collection#Singles and Unreleased, Vol. Two)
 Sue Raney (1969)later included in the compilation album Breathless (1997).
 Mel Torméincluded in the album Together Again: For the First Time (1978)
 Bobby Enriquezin the album Live! in Tokyo (1982)
 Nicole Croisille (1987)included in the album Jazzille/Jazzy
 Connie Evingsonincluded in the album Sweet Happy Life (2013)
Hank Jonesincluded in the album Bluesette (1979)
Elvina Makarian (Armenian Jazz singer)

References

Jazz compositions in B-flat major
Year of song missing